MeFeedia.com is a media search website founded in 2004 that features videos, TV shows, movies, and music among other material. The chief executive officer of MeFeedia is Frank C. Sinton III. Mefeedia's name is derived from how it receives all content from user-submitted video RSS feeds from other sites and vlogs.

Content

The main focus of the site is videos, with an emphasis on humorous videos, premium content, and other material targeted towards their male demographic. MeFeedia also has several video categories including TV, movies, sports, celebrity, news and entertainment. MeFeedia posts roughly 30 new videos on the homepage per day, mostly consisting of news clips from around the world.  The site also includes television clips and other viral videos.

The site does not allow video uploading, but collects videos from over 20,000 other video sites and blogs. Videos can be automatically added to the index by submitting media RSS feeds.

 MeFeedia was one of the top 750 most visited sites in the U.S. reaching a global monthly audience greater than 6.8 million uniques per month.

The website is owned by Beachfront Media, LLC.

Mainstream media content
In 2008, Mefeedia.com partnered with several content producers to expand its video inventory to include:

 Major Video Sharing sites (YouTube, DailyMotion, Metacafe, Blip, Veoh, and many more.
 Web Series Sites (AllorNots, Quarterlife, BoingBoing TV, 60 Frames series, Next New Networks series, etc.)
 Video Blogs (Steve Garfield, Ryan Is Hungry, etc.)
 TV Sites (Hulu, CBS, ABC, and others)
 News Sites (CNN, MSNBC, ABC News, CBS News, etc.)
 Music Sites (Imeem and others)

See also
Video sharing

References

External links
 Mefeedia.com
 Alexa: Mefeedia.com 
 Blog: Mefeedia Blog
American entertainment websites
Video hosting
Internet properties established in 2004